Zádub-Závišín is a municipality in Cheb District in the Karlovy Vary Region of the Czech Republic. It has about 300 inhabitants.

Administrative parts
The municipality is made up of villages of Milhostov, Zádub and Závišín.

References

Villages in Cheb District